Shaw's jird (Meriones shawi)  is a species of rodent in the family Muridae. It is found in Algeria, Egypt, Libya, Morocco, and Tunisia. Its natural habitats are arable land, pastureland, and rural gardens.

They typically live 1–2 years.

Shaw's jird is able to survive long periods of dehydration in semi-desert regions where it lives, in part because of its well developed kidneys. During the rainy season, Shaw's jirds breed more compared to summer when there is less rain.

In the Algerian highlands, they are a main prey source for Barn owls.

References

Meriones (rodent)
Mammals described in 1842
Taxa named by Georges Louis Duvernoy
Taxonomy articles created by Polbot